Valentino Guseli (born 1 April 2005) is an Australian snowboarder. He competed in the halfpipe event at the 2022 Winter Olympics.

References

Living people
2005 births
Australian male snowboarders
Olympic snowboarders of Australia
Snowboarders at the 2022 Winter Olympics
X Games athletes
Sportspeople from Canberra